Samuel Bernard Dick (October 26, 1836 – May 10, 1907) was an American politician who served as a Republican member of the U.S. House of Representatives from Pennsylvania from 1879 to 1881.

Biography
Samuel B. Dick (son of John Dick) was born in Meadville, Pennsylvania, where he attended the public schools and later Allegheny College.  Before the Civil War, he was engaged in banking.

During the war, Dick served as captain of Company F, 9th Pennsylvania Reserve Regiment.  He was severely wounded at the Battle of Dranesville, on December 20, 1861, and commanded the regiment at the Battle of Antietam.  He subsequently served as colonel of the regiment until February 1863, when he resigned.  He then commanded the Fifth Regiment, Pennsylvania Militia, and proceeded to New Creek, West Virginia, in July 1863.

He served as mayor of Meadville in 1870, and was an unsuccessful candidate for the House in 1870 and 1876.  Dick was elected as a Republican to the Forty-sixth Congress.  He was not a candidate for reelection in 1880.  (Local custom required a candidate from another county.)  He was a delegate at the 1900 Republican National Convention and an alternate in 1904.  He served as president of the Pittsburgh, Bessemer & Lake Erie Railroad Company until April 1900.  He was also president of Phoenix Iron Works Co.

He died in Meadville in 1907 and was interred at Greendale Cemetery.

References

External links
 Retrieved on 2008-02-14
The Political Graveyard

Dick's letter home from near Sharpsburg, MD, on Sep 25, 1862, postmarked Baltimore Sep 27.

1836 births
1907 deaths
19th-century American politicians
Allegheny College alumni
Chester
Pennsylvania Reserves
People of Pennsylvania in the American Civil War
Republican Party members of the United States House of Representatives from Pennsylvania
Union Army colonels
Burials at Greendale Cemetery